This is a list of endorsements for declared candidates for the 2019 leadership election for the Conservative Party of the United Kingdom.

Members of Parliament 
In total, 188 out of 313 Conservative MPs openly backed a bid by one of the candidates in the race.

James Cleverly 

Prior to his withdrawal on 4 June, James Cleverly had 4 backers among the Members of Parliament for the Conservative Party, including himself.
Colin Clark, MP for Gordon since 2017 (subsequently endorsed Johnson)
Julian Knight, MP for Solihull since 2015
Stephen Metcalfe, MP for South Basildon and East Thurrock since 2010 (subsequently endorsed Raab, then Gove)

Michael Gove 

Prior to his elimination on 20 June, Michael Gove had 36 backers among the Members of Parliament for the Conservative Party, including himself.

Peter Aldous, MP for Waveney since 2010
Kemi Badenoch, MP for Saffron Walden since 2017
Richard Bacon, MP for South Norfolk since 2001
Karen Bradley, Secretary of State for Northern Ireland since 2018 and MP for Staffordshire Moorlands since 2010
Jack Brereton, MP for Stoke-on-Trent South since 2017
Alberto Costa, MP for South Leicestershire since 2015
David Duguid, MP for Banff and Buchan since 2017
George Eustice, MP for Camborne and Redruth since 2010
Michael Fabricant, MP for Lichfield since 1992
Nick Gibb, MP for Bognor Regis and Littlehampton since 1997
Luke Graham, MP for Ochil and South Perthshire since 2017
Bill Grant, MP for Ayr, Carrick and Cumnock since 2017
Kirstene Hair, MP for Angus since 2017
John Hayes, MP for South Holland and The Deepings since 1997
Trudy Harrison, MP for Copeland since 2017
Damian Hinds, Secretary of State for Education since 2018 and MP for East Hampshire since 2010
Kevin Hollinrake, MP for Thirsk and Malton since 2015
Stephen Kerr, MP for Stirling since 2017
Edward Leigh, MP for Gainsborough since 1983
Oliver Letwin, Chancellor of the Duchy of Lancaster (2014–2016) and MP for West Dorset since 1997
Rachel Maclean, MP for Redditch since 2017
Mark Menzies, MP for Fylde since 2010
Stephen Metcalfe, MP for South Basildon and East Thurrock since 2010
Anne Milton, MP for Guildford since 2005
Nicky Morgan, Secretary of State for Education (2014–2016) and MP for Loughborough since 2010
David Mundell, Secretary of State for Scotland since 2015 and MP for Dumfriesshire, Clydesdale and Tweeddale since 2005 
Bob Neill, MP for Bromley and Chislehurst since 2006
Guy Opperman, MP for Hexham since 2010
Neil Parish, MP for Tiverton and Honiton since 2010
Claire Perry, Minister of State for Energy & Clean Growth since 2017 and MP for Devizes since 2010
John Stevenson, MP for Carlisle since 2010
Mel Stride, Leader of the House of Commons since 2019 and MP for Central Devon since 2010
Tom Tugendhat, MP for Tonbridge and Malling since 2015
Ed Vaizey, MP for Wantage since 2005
Giles Watling, MP for Clacton since 2017

Sam Gyimah 

Prior to his withdrawal on 10 June, Sam Gyimah had 4 backers among the Members of Parliament for the Conservative Party, including himself.
Guto Bebb, MP for Aberconwy since 2010
Dominic Grieve, Attorney General for England and Wales (2010–2014) and MP for Beaconsfield since 1997 (subsequently endorsed Stewart)
Phillip Lee, MP for Bracknell since 2010

Matt Hancock 

Prior to his withdrawal on 14 June, Matt Hancock had 17 backers among the Members of Parliament for the Conservative Party, including himself.

Bim Afolami, MP for Hitchin and Harpenden since 2017 (subsequently endorsed Johnson)
Andrew Bowie, MP for West Aberdeenshire and Kincardine since 2017 (subsequently endorsed Johnson)
Alex Chalk, MP for Cheltenham since 2015
Tracey Crouch, MP for Chatham and Aylesford since 2010 (subsequently endorsed Johnson)
Caroline Dinenage, MP for Gosport since 2010 (subsequently endorsed Hunt)
Jonathan Djanogly, MP for Huntingdon since 2001 (subsequently endorsed Hunt)
Tobias Ellwood, MP for Bournemouth East since 2005 (subsequently endorsed Stewart)
George Freeman, MP for Mid Norfolk since 2010
Damian Green, First Secretary of State (2017) and MP for Ashford since 1997 (subsequently endorsed Johnson)
Stephen Hammond, MP for Wimbledon since 2005
Margot James, MP for Stourbridge since 2010 (subsequently endorsed Stewart, then Hunt)
Seema Kennedy, MP for South Ribble since 2015
David Lidington, Minister for the Cabinet Office since 2018 and MP for Aylesbury since 1992 (subsequently endorsed Stewart)
Paul Masterton, MP for East Renfrewshire since 2017 (subsequently endorsed Stewart)
Caroline Spelman, Secretary of State for Environment, Food and Rural Affairs (2010–2012) and MP for Meriden since 1997 (subsequently endorsed Stewart)
Maggie Throup, MP for Erewash since 2015

Mark Harper 

Prior to his elimination on 13 June, Mark Harper had 8 backers among the Members of Parliament for the Conservative Party, including himself.

Steve Double, MP for St Austell and Newquay since 2015
Jackie Doyle-Price, MP for Thurrock since 2010
David Evennett, MP for Erith and Crayford (1983–1997) and Bexleyheath and Crayford since 2005 (subsequently endorsed Johnson)
Luke Hall, MP for Thornbury and Yate since 2015 (subsequently endorsed Javid)
Scott Mann, MP for North Cornwall since 2015 (subsequently endorsed Johnson)
Douglas Ross, MP for Moray since 2017 and MSP for Highlands and Islands (2016–2017) (subsequently endorsed Johnson)
William Wragg, MP for Hazel Grove since 2015

Jeremy Hunt 

Prior to his elimination on 23 July, Jeremy Hunt had 50 backers among the Members of Parliament for the Conservative Party, including himself.

Harriett Baldwin, MP for West Worcestershire since 2010
Peter Bottomley, MP for Woolwich West (1975–1983), Eltham (1983–1997) and Worthing West since 1997
Steve Brine, MP for Winchester since 2010
Alistair Burt, MP for Bury North (1983–1997) and North East Bedfordshire since 2001
James Cartlidge, MP for South Suffolk since 2015
Jo Churchill, MP for Bury St Edmunds since 2015
Greg Clark, Secretary of State for Business, Energy and Industrial Strategy since 2016 and MP for Tunbridge Wells since 2005
Glyn Davies, MP for Montgomeryshire since 2010
Caroline Dinenage, MP for Gosport since 2010
Jonathan Djanogly, MP for Huntingdon since 2001
Alan Duncan, MP for Rutland and Melton since 1992
Philip Dunne, MP for Ludlow since 2005
Mark Field, MP for the Cities of London and Westminster since 2001
Vicky Ford, MP for Chelmsford since 2017 and MEP for the East of England (2009–2017)
Liam Fox, Secretary of State for International Trade since 2016 and MP for North Somerset since 1992
Mike Freer, MP for Finchley and Golders Green since 2010
Roger Gale, MP for North Thanet since 1983
Mark Garnier, MP for Wyre Forest since 2010
Nus Ghani, MP for Wealden since 2015
Robert Goodwill, MP for Scarborough and Whitby since 2005
Richard Graham, MP for Gloucester since 2010
Greg Hands, Chief Secretary to the Treasury (2015–2016) and MP for Chelsea and Fulham since 2005
Oliver Heald, MP for North East Hertfordshire since 1992
Nick Herbert, MP for Arundel and South Downs since 2005
John Howell, MP for Henley since 2008
Margot James, MP for Stourbridge since 2010
Andrew Jones, MP for Harrogate and Knaresborough since 2010
Gillian Keegan, MP for Chichester since 2017
John Lamont, MP for Berwickshire, Roxburgh and Selkirk since 2017 and MSP for Ettrick, Roxburgh and Berwickshire (2007–2017)
Jeremy Lefroy, MP for Stafford since 2010
Alan Mak, MP for Havant since 2015
Patrick McLoughlin, Chancellor of the Duchy of Lancaster (2016–2018) and MP for Derbyshire Dales since 1986
Huw Merriman, MP for Bexhill and Battle since 2015
Penny Mordaunt, Secretary of State for Defence since 2019 and MP for Portsmouth North since 2010
David Morris, MP for Morecambe and Lunesdale since 2010
James Morris, MP for Halesowen and Rowley Regis since 2010
Wendy Morton, MP for Aldridge-Brownhills since 2015
Sarah Newton, MP for Truro and Falmouth since 2010
Mark Pawsey, MP for Rugby since 2010
John Penrose, MP for Weston-super-Mare since 2005
Mark Prisk, MP for Hertford and Stortford since 2001
Will Quince, MP for Colchester since 2015
Amber Rudd, Secretary of State for Work and Pensions since 2018 and MP for Hastings and Rye since 2010
Alec Shelbrooke, MP for Elmet and Rothwell since 2010
Keith Simpson, MP for Broadland since 2010
Royston Smith, MP for Southampton Itchen since 2015
Iain Stewart, MP for Milton Keynes South since 2010
Rory Stewart, eliminated 2019 leadership candidate, Secretary of State for International Development since 2019 and MP for Penrith and The Border since 2010
Helen Whately, MP for Faversham and Mid Kent since 2015

Sajid Javid 

Prior to his elimination on 20 June, Sajid Javid had 23 backers among the Members of Parliament for the Conservative Party, including himself.

Lucy Allan, MP for Telford since 2015
Edward Argar, MP for Charnwood since 2015
Victoria Atkins, MP for Louth and Horncastle since 2015
Fiona Bruce, MP for Congleton since 2010
Stephen Crabb, Secretary of State for Work and Pensions (2016) and MP for Preseli Pembrokeshire since 2005
Mims Davies, MP for Eastleigh since 2015 (subsequently endorsed Johnson)
Kevin Foster, MP for Torbay since 2015 (subsequently endorsed Johnson)
John Glen, MP for Salisbury since 2010
Luke Hall, MP for Thornbury and Yate since 2015
Robert Halfon, MP for Harlow since 2010
Simon Hoare, MP for North Dorset since 2015
Nigel Huddleston, MP for Mid Worcestershire since 2015
Caroline Nokes, Minister of State for Immigration since 2018 and MP for Romsey and Southampton North since 2010
Chris Philp, MP for Croydon South since 2015 (subsequently endorsed Johnson)
Mary Robinson, MP for Cheadle since 2015
Andrew Selous, MP for South West Bedfordshire since 2001
Chris Skidmore, MP for Kingswood since 2010 (subsequently endorsed Johnson)
Gary Streeter, MP for South West Devon since 1997
Derek Thomas, MP for St Ives since 2015
Robin Walker, MP for Worcester since 2010
Mike Wood, MP for Dudley South since 2015 (subsequently endorsed Johnson)
Jeremy Wright, Secretary of State for Digital, Culture, Media and Sport since 2018 and MP for Kenilworth and Southam since 2005

Boris Johnson 

Prior to his victory on 23 July, Boris Johnson had 146 backers among the Members of Parliament for the Conservative Party, including himself.

Nigel Adams, MP for Selby and Ainsty since 2010
Bim Afolami, MP for Hitchin and Harpenden since 2017
Stuart Andrew, MP for Pudsey since 2010
Steve Baker, MP for Wycombe since 2010
Steve Barclay, Secretary of State for Exiting the European Union since 2018 and MP for North East Cambridgeshire since 2010
Paul Beresford, MP for Croydon Central (1992–1997) and Mole Valley since 1997
Jake Berry, MP for Rossendale and Darwen since 2010
Crispin Blunt, MP for Reigate since 1997
Peter Bone, MP for Wellingborough since 2005
Andrew Bowie, MP for West Aberdeenshire and Kincardine since 2017 
Ben Bradley, MP for Mansfield since 2017
Suella Braverman, MP for Fareham since 2015
Andrew Bridgen, MP for North West Leicestershire since 2010
James Brokenshire, Secretary of State for Housing, Communities and Local Government since 2018, MP for Hornchurch (2005–2010) and Old Bexley and Sidcup since 2010
Robert Buckland, MP for South Swindon since 2010
Conor Burns, MP for Bournemouth West since 2010
Alun Cairns, Secretary of State for Wales since 2016 and MP for the Vale of Glamorgan since 2010
Bill Cash, MP for Stafford (1984–1997) and Stone since 1997
Rehman Chishti, MP for Gillingham and Rainham since 2010
Colin Clark, MP for Gordon since 2017
Simon Clarke, MP for Middlesbrough South and East Cleveland since 2017
James Cleverly, withdrawn 2019 leadership candidate and MP for Braintree since 2015
Therese Coffey, MP for Suffolk Coastal since 2010
Damian Collins, MP for Folkestone and Hythe since 2010
Robert Courts, MP for Witney since 2016
Geoffrey Cox, Attorney General for England and Wales since 2018 and MP for Torridge and West Devon since 2005
Tracey Crouch, MP for Chatham and Aylesford since 2010
David Davies, MP for Monmouth since 2005
Mims Davies, MP for Eastleigh since 2015
Philip Davies, MP for Shipley since 2005
David Davis, Secretary of State for Exiting the European Union (2016–2018) and MP for Haltemprice and Howden since 1987
Leo Docherty, MP for Aldershot since 2017
Nadine Dorries, MP for Mid Bedfordshire since 2005
Oliver Dowden, MP for Hertsmere since 2015
Richard Drax, MP for South Dorset since 2010
James Duddridge, MP for Rochford and Southend East since 2005
Iain Duncan Smith, Leader of the Conservative Party (2001–2003), Secretary of State for Work and Pensions (2010–2016) and MP for Chingford and Woodford Green since 1992
Michael Ellis, MP for Northampton North since 2010
Charlie Elphicke, MP for Dover since 2010
Nigel Evans, MP for Ribble Valley since 1992
David Evennett, MP for Erith and Crayford (1983–1997) and Bexleyheath and Crayford since 2005
Michael Fallon, Secretary of State for Defence (2014–2017), MP for Darlington (1983–1992) and Sevenoaks since 1997
Kevin Foster, MP for Torbay since 2015
Mark Francois, MP for Rayleigh and Wickford since 2001
Lucy Frazer, MP for South East Cambridgeshire since 2015
Marcus Fysh, MP for Yeovil since 2015
Zac Goldsmith, MP for Richmond Park (2010–2016; since 2017)
Helen Grant, MP for Maidstone and The Weald since 2010
Chris Grayling, Secretary of State for Transport since 2016 and MP for Epsom and Ewell since 2001
Chris Green, MP for Bolton West since 2015
Damian Green, First Secretary of State (2017) and MP for Ashford since 1997
Andrew Griffiths, MP for Burton since 2010
Robert Halfon, MP for Harlow since 2010
Matt Hancock, withdrawn 2019 leadership candidate and MP for West Suffolk since 2010
Simon Hart, MP for Carmarthen West and South Pembrokeshire since 2010
James Heappey, MP for Wells since 2015
Chris Heaton-Harris, MP for Daventry since 2010
Adam Holloway, MP for Gravesham since 2005
Eddie Hughes, MP for Walsall North since 2017
Sajid Javid, eliminated 2019 leadership candidate, Home Secretary since 2018 and MP for Bromsgrove since 2010
Ranil Jayawardena, MP for North East Hampshire since 2015
Bernard Jenkin, MP for Harwich and North Essex since 1992
Andrea Jenkyns, MP for Morley and Outwood since 2015
Robert Jenrick, MP for Newark since 2014
Caroline Johnson, MP for Sleaford and North Hykeham since 2016
Gareth Johnson, MP for Dartford since 2010
Jo Johnson, MP for Orpington since 2010
David Jones, Secretary of State for Wales (2012–2014) and MP for Clwyd West since 2005
Daniel Kawczynski, MP for Shrewsbury and Atcham since 2005
Greg Knight, MP for Derby North (1983–1997) and East Yorkshire since 2001
Kwasi Kwarteng, MP for Spelthorne since 2010
Mark Lancaster, MP for MP for Milton Keynes North East (2005–2010) and Milton Keynes North since 2010
Andrea Leadsom, eliminated 2019 leadership candidate, Leader of the House of Commons (2017–19) and MP for South Northamptonshire since 2010
Andrew Lewer, MP for Northampton South since 2017
Julian Lewis, MP for New Forest East since 1997
Ian Liddell-Grainger, MP for Bridgwater and West Somerset since 2001
Jack Lopresti, MP for Filton and Bradley Stoke since 2010
Tim Loughton, MP for East Worthing and Shoreham since 1997
Craig Mackinlay, MP for South Thanet since 2015
Anne Main, MP for St Albans since 2005
Kit Malthouse, withdrawn 2019 leadership candidate and MP for North West Hampshire since 2015
Scott Mann, MP for North Cornwall since 2015
Paul Maynard, MP for Blackpool North and Cleveleys since 2010
Anne Marie Morris, MP for Newton Abbot since 2010
Stephen McPartland, MP for Stevenage since 2010 
Esther McVey, eliminated 2019 leadership candidate, Secretary of State for Work and Pensions (2018) and MP for Tatton since 2017
Johnny Mercer, MP for Plymouth Moor View since 2015
Stephen Metcalfe, MP for South Basildon and East Thurrock since 2010
Amanda Milling, MP for Cannock Chase since 2015
Nigel Mills, MP for Amber Valley since 2010
Andrew Mitchell, Chief Whip of the House of Commons (2012), MP for Gedling (1987–1997) and Sutton Coldfield since 2001
Damien Moore, MP for Southport since 2017
Sheryll Murray, MP for South East Cornwall since 2010
Andrew Murrison, MP for South West Wiltshire since 2001
Matthew Offord, MP for Hendon since 2010
Priti Patel, Secretary of State for International Development (2016–2017) and MP for Witham since 2010
Owen Paterson, Secretary of State for Environment, Food and Rural Affairs (2012–2014) and MP for North Shropshire since 1997
Mike Penning, MP for Hemel Hempstead since 2005
Andrew Percy, MP for Brigg and Goole since 2010
Chris Philp, MP for Croydon South since 2015
Chris Pincher, MP for Tamworth since 2010
Rebecca Pow, MP for Taunton Deane since 2015
Mark Pritchard, MP for The Wrekin since 2005
Tom Pursglove, MP for Corby since 2015
Dominic Raab, eliminated 2019 leadership candidate, Secretary of State for Exiting the European Union (2018) and MP for Esher and Walton since 2010
John Redwood, Secretary of State for Wales (1993–1995) and MP for Wokingham since 1987
Jacob Rees-Mogg, MP for North East Somerset since 2010
Laurence Robertson, MP for Tewkesbury since 1997
Andrew Rosindell, MP for Romford since 2001
Douglas Ross, MP for Moray since 2017 and MSP for Highlands and Islands (2016–2017)
Lee Rowley, MP for North East Derbyshire since 2017
Grant Shapps, Minister without Portfolio (2012–2015) and MP for Welwyn Hatfield since 2005
Alok Sharma, MP for Reading West since 2010
Chloe Smith, MP for Norwich North since 2009
Bob Seely, MP for the Isle of Wight since 2017
Chris Skidmore, MP for Kingswood since 2010
Henry Smith, MP for Crawley since 2010
Andrew Stephenson, MP for Pendle since 2010
Bob Stewart, MP for Beckenham since 2010
Graham Stuart, MP for Beverley and Holderness since 2005
Julian Sturdy, MP for York Outer since 2010
Rishi Sunak, MP for Richmond (Yorks) since 2015
Desmond Swayne, MP for New Forest West since 1997
Hugo Swire, MP for East Devon since 2001
Robert Syms, MP for Poole since 1997
Ross Thomson, MP for Aberdeen South since 2017 and MSP for NE Scotland (2016–2017)
Kelly Tolhurst, MP for Rochester and Strood since 2015
Michael Tomlinson, MP for Mid Dorset and North Poole since 2015
Justin Tomlinson, MP for North Swindon since 2010
Craig Tracey, MP for North Warwickshire since 2015
David Tredinnick, MP for Bosworth since 1987
Anne-Marie Trevelyan, MP for Berwick-upon-Tweed since 2015
Liz Truss, Chief Secretary to the Treasury since 2017 and MP for South West Norfolk since 2010
Shailesh Vara, MP for North West Cambridgeshire since 2005
Martin Vickers, MP for Cleethorpes since 2010
Theresa Villiers, Secretary of State for Northern Ireland (2012–2016) and MP for Chipping Barnet since 2005
Ben Wallace, MP for Wyre and Preston North since 2005
David Warburton, MP for Somerton and Frome since 2015
Matt Warman, MP for Boston and Skegness since 2015
Heather Wheeler, MP for South Derbyshire since 2010
John Whittingdale, Secretary of State for Culture, Media and Sport (2015–2016) and MP for Maldon since 1992
Bill Wiggin, MP for North Herefordshire since 2001
Gavin Williamson, Secretary of State for Defence (2017–2019) and MP for South Staffordshire since 2010
Mike Wood, MP for Dudley South since 2015
Nadhim Zahawi, MP for Stratford-on-Avon since 2010

Andrea Leadsom 

Prior to her elimination on 13 June, Andrea Leadsom had five backers among the Members of Parliament for the Conservative Party, including herself.
Chris Heaton-Harris, MP for Daventry since 2010 (subsequently endorsed Johnson)
Tim Loughton, MP for East Worthing and Shoreham since 1997 (subsequently endorsed Johnson)
Heather Wheeler, MP for South Derbyshire since 2010 (subsequently endorsed Johnson)
Derek Thomas, MP for St Ives since 2015 (subsequently endorsed Javid)

Kit Malthouse 

Prior to his withdrawal on 4 June, Kit Malthouse had seven backers among the Members of Parliament for the Conservative Party, including himself.
Richard Benyon, MP for Newbury since 2005 (subsequently endorsed Stewart)
Alex Burghart, MP for Brentwood and Ongar since 2017
George Hollingbery, MP for Meon Valley since 2010
Paul Maynard, MP for Blackpool North and Cleveleys since 2010 (subsequently endorsed Johnson)
Sarah Newton, MP for Truro and Falmouth since 2010(subsequently endorsed Hunt)
Royston Smith, MP for Southampton Itchen since 2015 (subsequently endorsed Hunt)

Esther McVey 

Prior to her elimination on 13 June, Esther McVey had six backers among the Members of Parliament for the Conservative Party, including herself.
Ben Bradley, MP for Mansfield since 2017 (subsequently endorsed Johnson)
Philip Davies, MP for Shipley since 2005 (subsequently endorsed Johnson)
Pauline Latham, MP for Mid Derbyshire since 2010
Andrew Lewer, MP for Northampton South since 2017 (subsequently endorsed Johnson)
Gary Streeter, MP for Plymouth Sutton (1992–1997) and South West Devon since 1997 (subsequently endorsed Javid)

Dominic Raab] 

Prior to his elimination on 18 June, Dominic Raab had 25 backers among the Members of Parliament for the Conservative Party, including himself.

David Amess, MP for Southend West since 1997
John Baron, MP for Basildon and Billericay since 2001
Henry Bellingham, MP for North West Norfolk (1983–1997; since 2001)
Suella Braverman, MP for Fareham since 2015 (subsequently endorsed Johnson)
Maria Caulfield, MP for Lewes since 2015
Rehman Chishti, MP for Gillingham and Rainham since 2010 (subsequently endorsed Johnson)
Robert Courts, MP for Witney since 2016 (subsequently endorsed Johnson)
David Davies, MP for Monmouth since 2005 (subsequently endorsed Johnson)
David Davis, Secretary of State for Exiting the European Union (2016–2018) and MP for Haltemprice and Howden since 1987 (subsequently endorsed Johnson)
Helen Grant, MP for Maidstone and The Weald since 2010 (subsequently endorsed Johnson)
Chris Green, MP for Bolton West since 2015 (subsequently endorsed Johnson)
Eddie Hughes, MP for Walsall North since 2017 (subsequently endorsed Johnson)
Andrea Jenkyns, MP for Morley and Outwood since 2015 (subsequently endorsed Johnson)
Gareth Johnson, MP for Dartford since 2010(subsequently endorsed Johnson)
Jonathan Lord, MP for Woking since 2010
Stephen Metcalfe, MP for South Basildon and East Thurrock since 2010 (subsequently endorsed Gove)
Maria Miller, Secretary of State for Culture, Media and Sport (2012–2014) and MP for Basingstoke since 2005
Anne-Marie Morris, MP for Newton Abbot since 2010 (subsequently endorsed Johnson)
Andrew Murrison, MP for South West Wiltshire since 2001 (subsequently endorsed Johnson)
Tom Pursglove, MP for Corby since 2015 (subsequently endorsed Johnson)
Robert Syms, MP for Poole since 1997 (subsequently endorsed Johnson)
Michael Tomlinson, MP for Mid Dorset and North Poole since 2015(subsequently endorsed Johnson)
Shailesh Vara, MP for North West Cambridgeshire since 2005 (subsequently endorsed Johnson)
Nadhim Zahawi, MP for Stratford-on-Avon since 2010 (subsequently endorsed Johnson)

Rory Stewart 

Prior to his elimination on 19 June, Rory Stewart had 14 backers among the Members of Parliament for the Conservative Party, including himself.

 Richard Benyon, MP for Newbury since 2005
Kenneth Clarke, Father of the House since 2017 and MP for Rushcliffe since 1970
Tobias Ellwood, MP for Bournemouth East since 2005
David Gauke, Secretary of State for Justice since 2018 and MP for South West Hertfordshire since 2005
Dominic Grieve, Attorney General for England and Wales (2010–2014) and MP for Beaconsfield since 1997
Margot James, MP for Stourbridge since 2010 (subsequently endorsed Hunt)
Gillian Keegan, MP for Chichester since 2017(subsequently endorsed Hunt) 
David Lidington, Minister for the Cabinet Office since 2018 and MP for Aylesbury since 1992
Paul Masterton, MP for East Renfrewshire since 2017
Victoria Prentis, MP for Banbury since 2015
Antoinette Sandbach, MP for Eddisbury since 2015
Nicholas Soames, MP for Crawley (1983–1997) and Mid Sussex since 1997
Caroline Spelman, Secretary of State for Environment, Food and Rural Affairs (2010–2012) and MP for Meriden since 1997

Members of the European Parliament

Michael Gove
Nosheena Mobarik, MEP for Scotland since 2019

Former Cabinet ministers

Jeremy Hunt 
William Hague, First Secretary of State (2010–2015), Leader of the Conservative Party (1997–2001) and MP for Richmond (Yorks) (1989–2015)
John Major, Prime Minister of the United Kingdom (1990–1997) and MP for Huntingdon (1979–2001)

Boris Johnson 
 John Nott, Secretary of State for Defence (1981–1983) and MP for St Ives (1966–1983)
 George Osborne, First Secretary of State (2015–2016), Chancellor of the Exchequer (2010–2016) and MP for Tatton (2001–2017)

Former MPs and MEPs

Jeremy Hunt 
Ben Howlett, MP for Bath  (2015–2017)
Rob Wilson, MP for Reading East (2005–2017)

Boris Johnson 
Janice Atkinson, independent (formerly UKIP, until 2015) MEP for South East England (2014–2019) and Vice President of Europe of Nations and Freedom (2015–2019)
David Campbell Bannerman, MEP for the East of England (2009–2019)
Ashley Fox, MEP for South West England and Gibraltar (2009–2019) and Leader of the Conservatives in the European Parliament (2014–2019)
Stewart Jackson, MP for Peterborough (2005–2017)
Karl McCartney, MP for Lincoln (2010–2017)
James Wharton, MP for Stockton South (2010–2017)

Rory Stewart 
Sajjad Karim, MEP for North West England (2004–2019)

Peers

Jeremy Hunt
Michael Ashcroft, Deputy Chairman of the Conservative Party (2005–2010) and life peer since 2000

Sajid Javid 
Susan Williams, life peer since 2013

Boris Johnson 

 Tariq Ahmad, Minister of State for the Commonwealth and United Nations since 2017
Anthony Bamford, life peer since 2013
Michael Dobbs, life peer since 2010
Sir Bernard Hogan-Howe, Metropolitan Police Commissioner (2011–2017)
Alan Sugar, businessman and crossbench peer

Members of devolved legislatures

Michael Gove 
Ruth Davidson, Leader of the Scottish Conservatives since 2011, MSP for Glasgow (2011–2016) and Edinburgh Central since 2016
Rachael Hamilton, MSP for South Scotland (2016–2017) and Ettrick, Roxburgh and Berwickshire since 2017 (subsequently endorsed Hunt)

Jeremy Hunt 
Andrew Boff, Member of the London Assembly since 2008 and Leader of the London Assembly Conservative Group (2012–2016)

Sajid Javid 
Ruth Davidson, Leader of the Scottish Conservatives since 2011, MSP for Glasgow (2011–2016) and Edinburgh Central since 2016 (subsequently endorsed Gove)
Annie Wells, MSP for Glasgow since 2016

Boris Johnson 
Michelle Ballantyne, MSP for South Scotland since 2017
Margaret Mitchell, MSP for Central Scotland since 2003
Darren Millar, AM for Clwyd West since 2007
Andrew R. T. Davies, Leader of the Welsh Conservatives (2011–2018) and AM for South Wales Central since 2007
Gareth Bacon, Member of the London Assembly as the 1st Additional Member (2008–2016), for Bexley and Bromley since 2016 and Leader of the London Assembly Conservative Group since 2016
Steve O'Connell, Member of the London Assembly for Croydon and Sutton since 2008
Keith Prince, Member of the London Assembly for Havering and Redbridge since 2016
Tony Devenish, Member of the London Assembly for West Central since 2016

Rory Stewart 
Donald Cameron, MSP for the Highlands and Islands since 2016
Finlay Carson, MSP for Galloway and West Dumfries since 2016
Murdo Fraser, MSP for Mid Scotland and Fife since 2001 (subsequently endorsed Hunt)
Adam Tomkins, MSP for Glasgow since 2016

Directly elected mayors

Boris Johnson
 Ben Houchen, Tees Valley Mayor since 2017

Police and Crime Commissioners

Boris Johnson 
 Marc Jones, Lincolnshire Police and Crime Commissioner since 2016
 Alison Hernandez, Devon and Cornwall Police and Crime Commissioner since 2016
 Roger Hirst, Essex Police and Crime Commissioner since 2016
 Lorne Green, Norfolk Police and Crime Commissioner since 2016
 Stephen Mold, Northamptonshire Police and Crime Commissioner since 2016
 Anthony Stansfeld, Thames Valley Police and Crime Commissioner since 2012
 Philip Seccombe, Warwickshire Police and Crime Commissioner since 2016

Individuals

Sam Gyimah

Matt Hancock 
Rupert Harrison, economist and former government special advisor
Robert Rinder, criminal barrister and television personality

Jeremy Hunt 
Matthew Syed, author and former Olympian

Sajid Javid 
Matthew Elliott, political strategist and lobbyist
Rami Ranger, businessman
Ian Taylor, businessman

Boris Johnson 
Nimco Ali, activist
Robin Birley, businessman and entrepreneur
Tim Dawson, screenwriter
Giles Fraser, Anglican priest, journalist and broadcaster
Katie Hopkins, media personality and columnist
Christian Jessen, television presenter and doctor
Tim Martin, businessman and founder of Wetherspoons
Winston Peters, Deputy Prime Minister of New Zealand since 2017 and Leader of New Zealand First since 1993
Paul Staines, political blogger
Tim Stanley, journalist
Donald Trump, President of the United States since 2017

Rory Stewart 
Brian Cox, physicist
Gary Lineker, sports broadcaster and retired professional footballer
Mark Mitchell, National Party Member of the New Zealand Parliament for Rodney since 2011

Organisations

Matt Hancock 
Tattersalls

Boris Johnson 
 Turning Point UK
 Leave.EU

Dominic Raab 
Arbuthnot Banking Group

Publications

References 

2019 Conservative Party (UK) leadership election
Political endorsements in the United Kingdom
Conservative Party leadership election